Ål Lars Gunnar "Hulån" Larsson (born 1 July 1944) is a retired Swedish cross-country skier. He competed at the 1968 and 1972 Winter Olympics in the 15, 30, 50 and 4 × 10 km events and won two medals in 1968: a silver in the 4 × 10 km relay and a bronze over 15 km. In 1972 he finished fourth in the relay and 30 km events.

Domestically, Larsson won Swedish titles in the 15 km in 1971 and in the 30 km in 1969. His son Mats also became an Olympic cross-country skier.

Cross-country skiing results
All results are sourced from the International Ski Federation (FIS).

Olympic Games
 2 medals – (1 silver, 1 bronze)

See also
List of Olympic medalist families

References

External links
 

1944 births
Living people
People from Vansbro Municipality
Cross-country skiers from Dalarna County
Swedish male cross-country skiers
Cross-country skiers at the 1968 Winter Olympics
Cross-country skiers at the 1972 Winter Olympics
Olympic cross-country skiers of Sweden
Olympic silver medalists for Sweden
Olympic bronze medalists for Sweden
Olympic medalists in cross-country skiing
Medalists at the 1968 Winter Olympics